Senator Nash may refer to:

Abner Nash (1740–1786), North Carolina State Senate
William F. Nash (1847–1916), Wisconsin State Senate